Gelria is a thermophilic, anaerobic, obligately syntrophic, glutamate-degrading, endospore-forming bacterial genus in the family Thermoanaerobacteraceae.

The name of the genus comes from Gelre (present province of Gelderland), one of the 12 provinces in The Netherlands.

See also 
 List of bacterial genera named after geographical names

References

External links 

Thermoanaerobacterales
Bacteria genera
Monotypic bacteria genera
Thermophiles
Anaerobes